The horns of Ammon were curling ram horns, used as a symbol of the Egyptian deity Ammon (also spelled Amun or Amon). Because of the visual similarity, they were also associated with the fossils shells of ancient snails and cephalopods, the latter now known as ammonite because of that historical connection.

Classical iconography

Ammon, eventually Amon-Ra, was a deity in the Egyptian pantheon whose popularity grew over the years, until growing into a monotheistic religion in a way similar to the proposal that the Judeo-Christian deity evolved out of the Ancient Semitic pantheon. Egyptian pharaohs came to follow this religion for a while, Amenhotep and Tutankhamun taking their names from their deity. This trend caught on, with other Egyptian gods also sometimes being described as aspects of Amun.

Ammon was often depicted with ram's horns, so that as this deity became a symbol of supremacy, kings and emperors came to be depicted with Horns of Ammon on the sides of their head in profile, as well as the deities not only of Egypt, but other areas, so that Jupiter was sometimes depicted as "Jupiter Ammon", replete with Horns of Ammon, after Rome conquered Egypt, as was the Greek supreme deity Zeus. This tradition continued for centuries, with Alexander the Great being referred to in the Quran as “Dhu al-Qarnayn” (The Two-Horned One), a reference to his depiction on Middle Eastern coins and statuary as having horns of Ammon. His deification as a conqueror had involved being declared the metaphorical "Son of Ammon" by the Oracle at Siwa.

Considering the relative rarity of ammonite fossils in Egypt, this may have originated with fossil snail shells like natica hybrida found in Mokattam limestone near Cairo.

The direct attribution of the Horns of Ammon with fossil cephalopod shells became common during Medieval times with mentions by writers like Georgius Agricola and Conrad Gesner. These led to a widespread association that climaxed with paleontologist Karl Alfred von Zittel naming the class of animals Ammonoidea in 1848.

References

Egyptian mythology
Paleontology
Fossils
Ancient Egyptian religion